The 1931 Michigan State Normal Hurons football team was an American football team that represented Michigan State Normal College (later renamed Eastern Michigan University) as an independent during the 1931 college football season. In their 10th season under head coach Elton Rynearson, the Hurons compiled a 3–2–1 record and outscored their opponents by a total of 98 to 54. Ken Hawk was the team captain.  The team played its home games at Normal Field on the school's campus in Ypsilanti, Michigan.

Schedule

References

Michigan State Normal
Eastern Michigan Eagles football seasons
Michigan State Normal Hurons football